In basketball, effective field goal percentage (abbreviated eFG%) is a statistic that adjusts field goal percentage to account for the fact that three-point field goals count for three points while field goals only count for two points. Its goal is to show what field goal percentage a two-point shooter would have to shoot at to match the output of a player who also shoots three-pointers.

It is calculated by: 

where:
FG = field goals made
3P = 3-point field goals made
FGA = field goal attempts

It can also be calculated by: 

where: 
PPG = points per game
FT = the free throws made
FGA = field goal attempts

The advantage of this second formula is that it highlights the aforementioned logic behind the statistic, where it is pretended that a player only shot two-point shots (hence the division of non-free-throw points by 2).

An additional formula that seems to be more in use by the statistics actually displayed on websites (but less cited by said websites) is:

where:

2FG = 2-point field goals made
3FG = 3-point field goals made
FGA = field goal attempts

All three equations yield the same result.

References

Basketball statistics
Percentages